Virilization or masculinization is the biological development of adult male characteristics in young males or females. Most of the changes of virilization are produced by androgens.

Virilization is most commonly used in three medical and biology of sex contexts: prenatal biological sexual differentiation, the postnatal changes of typical chromosomal male (46, XY) puberty, and excessive androgen effects in typical chromosomal females (46, XX). It is also the intended result of androgen replacement therapy in males with delayed puberty and low testosterone.

Prenatal virilization
In the prenatal period, virilization refers to closure of the perineum, thinning and wrinkling (rugation) of the scrotum, growth of the penis, and closure of the urethral groove to the tip of the penis. In this context, masculinization is synonymous with virilization.

Prenatal virilization of genetic females and undervirilization of genetic males are common causes of ambiguous genitalia and intersex conditions.

High
Prenatal virilization of a genetically female fetus can occur when an excessive amount of androgen is produced by the fetal adrenal glands or is present in maternal blood. In the severest form of congenital adrenal hyperplasia, complete masculinization of a genetically female fetus results in an apparently normal male anatomy with no palpable testes. More often, the virilization is partial and the genitalia are ambiguous.

It can also be associated with progestin-induced virilisation.

Low
Undervirilization can occur if a genetic male cannot produce enough androgen or the body tissues cannot respond to it. Extreme undervirilization occurs when no significant androgen hormones can be produced or the body is completely insensitive to androgens. Both result in a female body. Partial undervirilization produces ambiguous genitalia part-way between male and female. The mildest degree of undervirilization may be a slightly small penis. Examples of undervirilization are androgen insensitivity syndrome, 5 alpha reductase deficiency, and some forms of congenital adrenal hyperplasia.

Normal virilization

In common as well as medical usage, virilization often refers to the process of normal male puberty. These effects include growth of the penis and testes, accelerated growth, development of pubic hair, and other androgenic hair of face, torso, and limbs, deepening of the voice, increased musculature, thickening of the jaw, prominence of the neck cartilage, and broadening of the shoulders.

Abnormal childhood virilization
Virilization can occur in childhood in both males and females due to excessive amounts of androgens. Typical effects of virilization in children are pubic hair, accelerated growth and bone maturation, increased muscle strength, acne, and adult body odor. In males, virilization may signal precocious puberty, while congenital adrenal hyperplasia and androgen producing tumors (usually) of the gonads or adrenals are occasional causes in both sexes.

In adolescent or adult females
Virilization in females can manifest as clitoral enlargement, increased muscle strength, acne, hirsutism, frontal hair thinning, deepening of the voice, menstrual disruption due to anovulation, and a strengthened libido. Some of the possible causes of virilization in females are:

 Androgen-producing tumors of the
 ovaries
 adrenal glands (see adrenal tumor)
 pituitary gland (see pituitary adenoma)
 Hyperthecosis
 Hypothyroidism
 Anabolic steroid exposure
 Congenital adrenal hyperplasia due to 21-hydroxylase deficiency (late-onset)
 Conn's syndrome

Medically induced virilization in transgender people 
Transgender people who were medically assigned female at birth sometimes elect to take hormone replacement therapy. This process causes virilization by inducing many of the effects of a typically male puberty. Many of these effects are permanent, but some effects can be reversed if the transgender individual stops or pauses their medical treatment.

Permanent virilization effects 
 Deepening of the voice
 Growth of facial and body hair
 Male-pattern baldness
 Enlargement of the clitoris
 Breast atrophy – possible shrinking and/or softening of breasts

Reversible virilization effects 
 Further muscle development (especially upper body)
 Increased sweat and changes in body odor
 Prominence of veins and coarser skin
 Alterations in blood lipids (cholesterol and triglycerides)
 Increased red blood cell count

Demasculinization
Demasculinization refers to the reversal of virilization. Some but not all aspects of virilization are reversible. Demasculinization occurs naturally with andropause, pathologically with hypogonadism, and artificially or medically with antiandrogens, estrogens, and orchiectomy. It is desired by transgender women who have undergone the changes of pubertal masculinization, to restore and induce feminine physical traits that would otherwise be masked or never occur. Some virilized traits remain though (such as body hair, a hard jawline and an enlarged larynx), due to the fashion in which virilization affects a body's physiology.

See also 

Ambiguous genitalia
Androgen
Clitoromegaly
Defeminization
Feminization (biology)
Hirsutism
Secondary sex characteristics
Sexual differentiation

References

Further reading
 Howell, W. M., Black, D. A., & Bortone, S. A. (1980). Abnormal expression of secondary sex characters in a population of mosquitofish, Gambusia affinis holbrooki: evidence for environmentally-induced masculinization. Copeia, 676–681.

External links

Sexual dimorphism
Metabolism
Physiology
Testosterone